Gobio volgensis is a species of gudgeon, a small freshwater in the family Cyprinidae. It is endemic to the Volga River basin in Russia..

References

 

Gobio
Fish described in 2008